The Ireland women's national 3x3 team is a national basketball team of Ireland, administered by Basketball Ireland. It represents the country in international women's 3x3 basketball competitions.

References

Women's national 3x3 basketball teams
Ireland women's national basketball team